Marijane Osborn (born 1934) is an American academic. Her research spans literary disciplines; she is a specialist in Old English and Norse literature and is known as an early pioneer of ecocriticism. Osborn has published on runes, Middle English, Victorian and contemporary poets and writers, and film, and is a translator and fiction writer. She is Professor Emerita at UC Davis.

Academic career 
Professor Osborn's holds a BA from the University of California, Berkeley, class of 1962. She holds an MA and PhD from Stanford University, completing her postgraduate study as the first supervisee of Fred C Robinson in 1969. She has held a teaching position at UC Davis since 1981, retiring to Emerita status in 2007. Osborn has also taught or held fellowships at the Universities of Oxford, Syracuse, Columbia, Lancaster, Edinburgh, Queen's Belfast, Alaska, Hawaii, Iceland, and UC Davis.

Research 
Osborn held a research Fellowship at The Institute for Advanced Studies in the Humanities, University of Edinburgh in 1973, during which time she researched Old English poetry and developed her interest in 'place study'. Osborn went on to hold a Fulbright Fellowship to Iceland, 1978–79 and 1983-84. Arising from this work in Scotland and Iceland, Osborn and her collaborator, Gillian Overing, pioneered the application of place study to early medieval literary studies in their book Landscape of Desire (1994), which was dismissed or ignored by some scholars at the time, but is now recognised as pioneering ecocriticsm.

Osborn's translation of Beowulf, published as a Verse Translation with Treasures of the Ancient North (1983), brought together material culture from across northern Europe to 'help us visualise the world of the poem'.

Osborn is well known for her work on medieval work in translation, especially the Old English poem Beowulf. In 2003, the Arizona Center for Medieval and Renaissance Studies published Marijane Osborn's annotated list of over 300 translations and adaptations.

A festschrift, Translating the Past, containing essays on Old English, Middle English, and Renaissance literature in their original and translated contexts, was published in honour of Osborn in 2012.

Selected publications

Non fiction 
Beowulf, A Likeness, (1990) a collaboration with designer Randolph Swearer and poet Raymond Oliver 

Landscape of Desire: Partial Stories of the Medieval Scandinavian World, (1994), written with Gillian Overing 

The Twilight Mystique: Critical Essays on the Novels and Films, (2010), a collection of essays on the Twilight franchise, edited with Amy M. Clarke and Donald E. Palumbo

Translations and creative versions of medieval literature 
Beowulf, a Verse Translation with Treasures of the Ancient North (1983), 

'The Fates of Women (from four Anglo-Saxon poems)', in New Readings on Women in Old English Literature, ed. by Helen Damico and Alexandra Hennessey Olsen, pp. xi-xiii.

Grendel's Mother Broods Over Her Feral Son (2006), published in the Old English Newsletter.

Nine Medieval Romances of Magic (2010), 

Thirty Viking Haikus (2015) published in Stand magazine.

Poetry Translations 
"Sunstone", translation of a major long poem by Octavio Paz, Hyperion 13, 177-188.

Fiction 
The Woods of Leith, forthcoming children's book.

References 

Living people
American academics of English literature
Anglo-Saxon studies scholars
University of California, Davis faculty
University of California, Berkeley alumni
Stanford University alumni
1934 births
Date of birth missing (living people)
Place of birth missing (living people)
Translators from Old English